Chilumula Madan Reddy is a politician from the Indian state of Telangana. He is currently representing the Bharat Rashtra Samithi as an MLA from Narsapur Assembly constituency.

Early life and education 
Madan Reddy was born on 1 January 1951 to Manikya Reddy and Lalithamma in Kaudipalli village of Kaudipalli mandal, Medak district, Telangana state. He completed his B.Com graduation in 1971 from Badruka College under Osmania University.

Political career 
Madan Reddy, started his political career with the Telugu Desam Party contested from the Narsapur Assembly constituency in 2004 and lost against the Indian National Congress candidate Vakiti Sunitha Laxma Reddy by a margin of 25817 votes. After that he joined the Telangana Rashtra Samithi.

Later in 2014 Telangana  elections, he contested again from the Narsapur constituency representing Telangana Rashtra Samiti and won against the Indian National Congress candidate Vakiti Sunitha Lakshmareddy with a majority of 14,217 votes.

In the 2018 Telangana elections, he again contested from the same party and same constituency and won against the same Indian National Congress candidate with a majority of 38,120 votes. He served twice as the Director of Andhra Pradesh State Irrigation Development Corporation and once as the Chairman of Medak District Library Corporation.

References 

1951 births
Telangana Rashtra Samithi politicians
Living people
Telugu people
People from Medak district
Andhra Pradesh MLAs 2014–2019
Andhra Pradesh MLAs 2019–2024